The Wacker is a small river of North Rhine-Westphalia, Germany. It is a left tributary of the Bache (the upper course of the Heve). The Heve is a tributary of the Möhne.

See also
List of rivers of North Rhine-Westphalia

References

Rivers of North Rhine-Westphalia
Rivers of Germany